The Roman Catholic Diocese of Itapetininga is a diocese located in the city of Itapetininga in the Ecclesiastical province of Sorocaba in Brazil.

History
 15 April 1998: Established as Diocese of Itapetininga from the Diocese of Itapeva and Metropolitan Archdiocese of Sorocaba

Leadership
 Bishops of Itapetininga (Roman rite)
 Bishop Gorgônio Alves da Encarnação Neto, C.R. (April 15, 1998 – present)

References
 GCatholic.org
 Catholic Hierarchy

Roman Catholic dioceses in Brazil
Christian organizations established in 1998
Itapetininga, Roman Catholic Diocese of
Roman Catholic dioceses and prelatures established in the 20th century